"Manchester" is a single by the British band The Beautiful South. It reached #41 in the UK charts. The song also appeared on their album Superbi.

"Manchester" is a song about the city of Manchester in North West England, and its apparent notoriety for a rainy climate.

"Manchester" immortalised many towns and settlements in its lyrics:

"From Northenden to Partington it's rain
From Altrincham to Chadderton it's rain
From Moss Side to Swinton hardly Spain
It's a picture postcard of 'wish they never came"

References

2006 singles
Music in Manchester
Songs about cities
The Beautiful South songs